HOHMS (pronounced "Homes") is the medical acronym for "Higher-Order HistoMolecular Stratification", a term and concept which was first applied to lung cancer research and treatment theory.

The HOHMS Paradigm postulates that lung cancer cases can be more effectively treated if different tumors can be rationally classified into more homogeneous groups (or "strata"). These could then be used in randomized clinical trials with maximized potential for detecting significant differences in treatment regimens and other characteristics of the differing variants.

Rational stratification under the HOHMS paradigm uses a combination of histological criteria and molecular characteristics of the tumor.

Origin
The HOHMS acronym was first applied to lung cancer and further developed in 2003 by Cliff Knickerbocker, Walton Distinguished Doctoral Fellow at the University of Arkansas. The HOHMS Paradigm is the major focus of Knickerbocker's doctoral dissertation. It has been validated (in part) by subsequent advances in research and clinical practice.

Traditional lung cancer treatment paradigms
Lung cancer was less common in the USA during the early part of the 20th century, before manufacturing of cigarettes by rolling machines. During this period, all malignant lung tumors were considered equivalent for treatment purposes.

In the early 1960s, small cell lung carcinoma (SCLC) was recognized for its unique biological behavior, including a much higher frequency of widespread metastasis at diagnosis, and a higher frequency of sensitivity to chemotherapy and radiation therapy. Early studies suggested that patients with SCLC fared better when treated with chemotherapy and/or radiation than when treated surgically, while non-small cell lung carcinoma (NSCLC) patients generally did better after surgery, and usually did not respond well to chemoradiation. This "traditional" paradigm, wherein treatment options for lung cancer patients were based on histological stratification into two highly heterogeneous groups (i.e. SCLC vs. NSCLC), remained the standard for approximately 30–40 years.

In the last two decades, however, the development of molecularly targeted agents have led to an increased emphasis on more precise typing and subtyping of lung carcinomas. Although these new therapies have had little impact on the treatment of SCLC, some very promising results have been obtained in certain histiological types and subtypes of NSCLC's.

Rationale for the HOHMS paradigm
The "HOHMS Paradigm" posits that treatment regimens for lung cancer patients should be based on a high level of histological and molecular stratification to maximize response rates and survival prolongation, and minimize toxicity.

The choice of regimen should be based, insofar as is possible, on the results of large-scale randomized clinical trials. When large-scale trials have not been conducted, meta-analyses of databases of patient series and case reports can be utilized.

Histological stratification should be based on subtypes recognized in the 2004 revision of the World Health Organization (WHO) lung tumor typing system.

Specific histomolecular strata in NSCLC
Adenocarcinomas:
EGFR Mutations
K-ras Mutations
EML4-ALK Fusions and Mutations
Signet ring cell
Acinar
Papillary
Micropapillary

Squamous cell carcinomas:
Small cell, poorly differentiated
Basaloid

Large cell carcinomas:
Undifferentiated
Lymphoepithelioma-like
Rhabdoid phenotype

Other NSCLC's:
Clear cell variants
Giant cell carcinomas

 HOHMS applied to certain lung cancer variants 
Undifferentiated large cell lung cancer has been shown to be particularly responsive to pemetrexed.
EML4-ALK (+) lung cancers
Acinar predominant adenocarcinoma and crizotinib
Signet ring cell adenocarcinoma and crizotinib
Papillary adenocarcinoma
BAC with EGFR (+)
Squamous cell carcinoma (cisplatinum/gemcitabine)
Squamous cell carcinoma (no bevacizumab/anti-VEGF in cavitary or in near large vessels

References

External links
 Lung Cancer Home Page. The National Cancer Institute site containing further reading and resources about lung cancer.
 . World Health Organization Histological Classification of Lung and Pleural Tumours. 4th Edition.

Lung cancer